Laval West (formerly known as Mille-Iles and Laval) was a federal electoral district in Quebec, Canada, that was represented in the House of Commons of Canada from 1979 to 2004.

It was created as the riding of "Mille-Iles" in 1976 from parts of Laval riding. It was renamed "Laval" in 1977, and "Laval West" in 1990.

In 2003, the riding was abolished when it was redistributed into Laval and Laval—Les Îles ridings.

Members of Parliament

This riding elected the following members of the House of Commons of Canada:

Election results

Laval, 1977-1993

 

|}

 

|}

Laval West, 1993-2004

 

    

|}

 

|}

 

|}

See also 

 List of Canadian federal electoral districts
 Past Canadian electoral districts

External links
Riding history from the Library of Parliament:
Mille-Iles 1976-1977
Laval 1977-1990
Laval West 1990-2003

Former federal electoral districts of Quebec
Politics of Laval, Quebec